Attleboro is a station stop on the RTA Green Line in Shaker Heights, Ohio, located at the intersection of Southington Road and Shaker Boulevard (Ohio State Route 87).

History
The station opened on December 17, 1913, with the initiation of rail service on what is now Shaker Boulevard from Coventry Road to Fontenay Road three blocks east of here. The line was built by Cleveland Interurban Railroad and initially operated by the Cleveland Railway.

In 1980 and 1981, the Green and Blue Lines were completely renovated with new track, ballast, poles and wiring, and new stations were built along the line. The renovated line along Shaker Boulevard opened on October 11, 1980.

Station layout
The station comprises two side platforms, the westbound platform east of the intersection, and the eastbound platform west of the intersection, with a small shelter on the westbound platform.

References

External links

Green Line (RTA Rapid Transit)
Railway stations in the United States opened in 1913
1913 establishments in Ohio